The Urugua-í River is a river in the Misiones Province of Argentina. It is a tributary of the Paraná River.

Course

Tributaries include the Sarita River, Arroyo de las Cabeceras and Uruzú River.
The Urugua-í River flows through the southern part of the Urugua-í Provincial Park in a southeast – northwest direction and is impounded by the Urugua-í Dam to the west of the park.

See also
List of rivers of Argentina

References

Sources

Rivers of Argentina